Folder most commonly refers to: 
Folder, one who folds laundry or dry cleaning, e.g., (see Fluff and Fold)
 File folder, a kind of folder that holds loose sheets of paper 

Folder or folding may also refer to:

People
 Pole Folder, stage name of Benoit Franquet, producer of electronic music

Art, entertainment, and media
Folder, a J-pop group
 Folder 5, a spinoff group from the J-pop group Folder

Computing 
 Folder (computing), a virtual container within a digital file system, in which groups of files and other folders can be kept and organized, a.k.a. list of files
 FOLDER (disk compression), a disk compression component of PTS-DOS

Technology and transportation
 Folding bicycle, a bicycle which can be folded for compactness
Folding kayak, a kayak which can be folded for compactness
 Folding machine, a machine used for folding paper
 Short Folder, a series of aeroplanes designed with folding wings for shipborne use (from 1913)

See also
 Folding (disambiguation)